All About My Mom is a 2015 South Korean television series starring Eugene and Lee Sang-woo. It aired on KBS2 from August 15, 2015, to February 14, 2016, every Saturday and Sunday at 19:55 (KST).

Synopsis
Jin-ae (Eugene) works hard to make money only to end up spending it on her family, and her mother San-ok shows so much affection towards her first son only. Jin-ae then meets Kang Hoon-jae (Lee Sang-woo), who coincidentally is the son of her boss whom she admires, and marries him. While experiencing difficult times with her mother-in-law, Jin-ae begins to understand her own mother for the first time.

Cast

Main
Eugene as Lee Jin-ae
Lee Sang-woo as Kang Hoon-jae

Supporting

Lee Jin-ae's family
Go Doo-shim as Im San-ok
Kim Kap-soo as Lee Dong-chul
Oh Min-suk as Lee Hyung-kyu
Choi Tae-joon as Lee Hyung-soon

Kang Hoon-jae's family
Kim Mi-sook as Hwang Young-sun
Hwang Jung-min as Yeom Nan-sook

Sun Hye-joo's family
Son Yeo-eun as Sun Hye-joo
Nam Gi-ae as Hong Yoo-ja
Gil Jung-woo as Kim San

Jang Chul-woong's family
Song Seung-hwan as Jang Chul-woong
 Jang Seung-jo as young Chul-woong
Jo Bo-ah as Jang Chae-ri
Kim Young-ok as Song Ki-nam

Extended
Song Jong-ho as Yoon Sang-hyuk
Kwon Mina as Go Aeng-doo
Kim Sun-woong as Min-sun	
Chae So-young as Shin Yoo-hee
Tae Hang-ho as Park Kye-tae
Min Ji-ah as Son Yoo-kyung
Susanna Noh as Gong Na-ri
Yang Joo-ho as Lawyer Hwang
Jung Eun-pyo as Manager Yang
Kim Ji-eun as Hong-do
Lee Si-won as Yoo Ji-yeon
Yoon Hee-seok as Song Joon-young
Lee Jin-kwon as Supporting
Jang In-sub as Shin Jae-min

Cameo appearances
Kim Jun-hyun as President Kim

Ratings
In the table below, the blue numbers represent the lowest ratings and the red numbers represent the highest ratings.

Awards and nominations

Remake
This series is remade in Vietnam as Giấc mơ của mẹ, aired on government-owned HTV2 and VieOn in 2022.

International broadcast
Philippines - GMA Network (24 July 2017 – 22 September 2017)
Singapore - Channel U (18 December 2017)

References

External links
  
 
 

Korean Broadcasting System television dramas
2015 South Korean television series debuts
2015 South Korean television series endings
Korean-language television shows
South Korean melodrama television series
Television series by KBS Media